Robert McMillan may refer to:
 Robert S. McMillan (architect) (1916–2001), architect and co-founder of The Architects Collaborative
 Robert S. McMillan (astronomer), astronomer at the University of Arizona
 Robert McMillan (Australian judge) (1858–1931), Chief Justice of the Supreme Court of Western Australia
 Robert Johnston McMillan (1885–1941), U.S. federal judge
 Robert Thomas McMillan (1887–1962), member of the New Zealand Legislative Council
 Robert McMillan (footballer) (1857–?), Welsh footballer
 Robert MacMillan (1865–1936), Scottish national rugby union player
 Bob MacMillan (born 1952), Canadian hockey player and politician

See also
 Robbie Coltrane (actually Anthony Robert McMillan, 1950–2022), Scottish actor
 McMillan (surname)